Marina Zenovich is an American filmmaker known for her biographical documentaries. Her films include LANCE, Robin Williams: Come Inside My Mind, Richard Pryor: Omit the Logic and Roman Polanski: Wanted and Desired, which won two Emmy awards.

Early life and education
Zenovich was born in Fresno, California. She is the daughter of George N. Zenovich, a former California State Senator and Judge of Serbian heritage, and Vera "Kika"” Zenovich, who was born in Dubrovnik, Yugoslavia. Her sister is actress Ninon Zenovich (aka Ninon Aprea). The Fifth District Court of Appeals Courthouse in Fresno is named after her father.  When he died in 2013, she made a film for the memorial service to celebrate his life.

Zenovich graduated  from Bullard High School in Fresno, California. Zenovich first studied drama at the University of Southern California and then switched majors, graduating with a degree in journalism. During college, she worked for Hollywood producer Mike Frankovich and also in the press department of the Los Angeles Olympic Organizing Committee. Following graduation, Zenovich moved to New York City, where she acted in short films and off-Broadway plays. Zenovich studied acting at the William Esper Studio in Manhattan, furthering her studies with Ron Burrus and Stella Adler. She later acted in several movies including Robert Altman's The Player and actress Talia Shire's One Night Stand. Zenovich's voiceover work includes Alex Gibney's Going Clear: Scientology and the Prison of Belief. She is also the voice of a rubber band in the 2011 children's film Bands on the Run.

In 1997, Zenovich began working as a segment producer on John Pierson's TV series Split Screen, which was broadcast on the Independent Film Channel. Due to her work on Split Screen, she became interested in becoming a director and working on feature documentaries.

Career

Independent's Day
Shot in 1996–1997, Zenovich's first film Independent's Day premiered at the Slamdance Film Festival in 1998. The documentary was inspired by the three filmmakers who founded the aforementioned festival, after being rejected by the more established Sundance Film Festival. Zenovich's documentary explores the struggles of independent filmmakers and includes interviews with Steven Soderbergh, Greg Mottola, Tom DiCillo, Eric Schaeffer, Sydney Pollack, Parker Posey, Roger Ebert, John Pierson, among others.

While screening Independent's Day on the festival circuit, Zenovich met investor Bob Sturm who hired her to work at his new film company Catch 23 Entertainment. Zenovich started out in the development department and went on to become Senior Vice President of Film Development & Production, while continuing to make documentaries on the side.

Who Is Bernard Tapie?
Zenovich's next film idea came about in 1997, after a screening at the Directors Guild of America, where French filmmaker Claude Lelouch introduced his film Hommes, femmes, mode d'emploi. Lelouche mentioned that the star of the film, Bernard Tapie, was in jail, prompting Zenovich to find out why. She spent several years going back and forth to Paris, shooting footage for Who Is Bernard Tapie? Unable to get an interview with Tapie, Zenovich filmed herself as she tried to contact the actor/businessman, hoping to get his attention. The 2001 documentary, with Steven Soderbergh as its executive producer, was aired on the Sundance Channel and as an episode of the BBC's Storyville series. Zenovich was also profiled in The New York Times about her quest to make the documentary.

Estonia Dreams of Eurovision!
Zenovich also appeared on camera in her following film Estonia Dreams of Eurovision! She traveled to Tallinn, Estonia to document the preparations leading up to hosting the Eurovision Song Contest. The 2003 film was broadcast as part of the BBC series Arena and also on the Sundance Channel. It was produced by Vikram Jayanti.

Art in Progress (TV series)
In the early 2000s, Zenovich worked on the series Art in Progress for Gallery HD, an arts channel part of Voom HD Networks. She traveled the world filming profiles of artists as they prepared for major exhibitions. Her episodes include: Tim Noble & Sue Webster: Now Here (in Athens, Greece); Julian Schnabel in Naples; David Lynch in Milan; Vanessa Beecroft in Berlin; Robert Wilson: Video Portraits (in Paris); Takashi Murakami (in Los Angeles); John Baldessari (in Belgium); Damien Elwes (in Santa Monica); and Sam Maloof (in Claremont).

Roman Polanski: Wanted and Desired
Zenovich came up with the subject of her next documentary film, after reading a story in the Los Angeles Times in 2003. The article questioned whether director Roman Polanski could re-enter the United States, if nominated for an Oscar for The Pianist. Polanski had fled the U.S. in the late 1970s after being accused of sexual assault of a minor.

Five years in the making, Zenovich's Roman Polanski: Wanted and Desired premiered at the 2008 Sundance Film Festival, receiving wide media attention. The film's editor Joe Bini won the award for Best Editing. The documentary received a Special Screening at the Cannes Film Festival. Entertainment Weekly called it "A film of rare fascination and power." The film also won two Primetime Emmys for Outstanding Directing for Nonfiction Programming and Outstanding Writing for Nonfiction Programming (shared with Joe Bini & P.G. Morgan). Wanted and Desired was selected by the National Board of Review as one of the Best Documentaries of 2008.

Roman Polanski: Odd Man Out
Soon after its release, Polanski's legal team used the film Roman Polanski: Wanted and Desired as part of their argument for reopening the 30 year old case. Since her documentary about the film director was being used as evidence, Zenovich decided to continue shooting the story. The result was a follow-up film, Roman Polanski: Odd Man Out.

The second documentary was originally meant to examine how the central characters felt about the incident. Zenovich filmed Samantha Gailey and her mother in Hawaii, and also planned on meeting Polanski for an interview. However, two months before the scheduled interview, Polanski was arrested in Switzerland on his way to receive a Lifetime Achievement Award at the Zurich Film Festival. As a result, Zenovich's follow-up film became linked to a big international news story.

Roman Polanski: Odd Man Out debuted at the Toronto Film Festival in 2012 and subsequently played at the New York Film Festival, also airing on the Showtime network.

Richard Pryor: Omit the Logic
Zenovich's next film, Richard Pryor: Omit the Logic, was made for Showtime and executive produced by Roy Ackerman. The documentary features interviews with Robin Williams, Mike Epps, Bob Newhart, Mel Brooks, David Banks, Whoopi Goldberg and an interview with Pryor's lawyer Skip Brittenham. Zenovich came up with the film's title during her interview with writer David Banks, who stated, "With Richard, you have to omit the logic."

The documentary premiered at the Tribeca Film Festival in 2013 where Zenovich participated in a discussion with Tracy Morgan, Wyatt Cenac, Walter Mosley and Jennifer Pryor. The panel was moderated by writer Jacob Bernstein. Omit the Logic won the NAACP Image Award for Best Television Documentary. The film's editor Chris A. Peterson was also nominated for a Primetime Emmy for Outstanding Editing.

Fantastic Lies
In 2014, Zenovich addressed another controversial story, the 2006 Duke Lacrosse scandal. The resulting film, Fantastic Lies, was aired on ESPN's 30 for 30 series and earned positive reviews. The documentary premiered at SXSW Film Festival in 2016, also receiving nominations for Best Sports Documentary and Best TV/Streaming Documentary at the Critics Choice Awards.

Water & Power: A California Heist
In 2016 Zenovich took on the California water crisis. Her documentary Water & Power: A California Heist premiered at the Sundance Film Festival in 2017 and was nominated for the Grand Jury prize. The film also played in theaters and aired on the National Geographic channel.

Robin Williams: Come Inside My Mind
In 2018, Zenovich returned to Sundance for the third time with her HBO feature documentary, Robin Williams: Come Inside My Mind. The film played six sell-out screenings and received positive reviews. It was also screened at the Nantucket Film Festival and had a first HBO broadcast on July 16, 2018. That same summer, the documentary was shown at the Hamptons International Film Festival SummerDocs, accompanied by a discussion with Zenovich and Q&A host Alec Baldwin. Variety Magazine described the film as being "sharp-edged, humane, and deeply researched enough to take you closer to the manic engine of Williams’ brilliance and pain".

The documentary celebrates the life and career of comedian Robin Williams who died in 2014.  Zenovich recorded interviews with Whoopi Goldberg, David Letterman, Billy Crystal, among others. She also included outtakes and little known clips from Williams' stand-up routines, after sifting through a large amount of archival footage. Describing the process as laborious yet amazing, Zenovich stated that, "Anytime you make a movie, no matter how many you’ve made, it’s like you’re doing it for the first time."

LANCE
In 2020 Marina Zenovich once again returned to Sundance with her two-part film LANCE for ESPN.

Memberships
Zenovich is an active member of the Academy of Motion Picture Arts and Sciences, The National Academy of Television Arts & Sciences, the Directors Guild of America, and the International Documentary Association.

Awards and nominations
For Roman Polanski: Wanted and Desired, Zenovich won two Emmys for writing and directing for non-fiction programming. She also garnered one nomination for producing. At the Sundance Film Festival, the documentary was nominated for the Grand Jury Prize and won an award for film editing.

2017 – Sundance Film Festival Water & Power: A California Heist

2016 – SXSW Film Festival SXSW Gamechanger Award Nominee Fantastic Lies

2016 – Critics Choice Award Best Documentary Feature (TV/Streaming), Best Sports Documentary Fantastic Lies

2013 – NAACP Image Award Best Documentary Richard Pryor: Omit the Logic

2009 – Emmy Winner Writing for Non-Fiction Programming, Directing Roman Polanski: Wanted and Desired

2009 – Emmy Nominee Non-Fiction Special Roman Polanski: Wanted and Desired

2008 – Sundance Film Festival Documentary Film Editing Award Roman Polanski: Wanted and Desired

2008 – Libertas Film Festival (Dubrovnik, Croatia) Best Documentary Film Roman Polanski: Wanted and Desired

Festivals
Sundance Film Festival  LANCE

Sundance Film Festival Robin Williams: Come Inside My Mind; Water & Power: A California Heist; Roman Polanski: Wanted and DesiredHamptons International Film Festival’s SummerDoc series: Robin Williams: Come Inside My MindMunich International Film Festival Robin Williams: Come Inside My MindKarlovy Vary International Film Festival Robin Williams: Come Inside My MindMartha’s Vineyard International Film Festival: Robin Williams: Come Inside My MindProvincetown International Film Festival Robin Williams: Come Inside My MindNantucket Film Festival Robin Williams: Come Inside My MindCannes Film Festival Roman Polanski: Wanted and DesiredNew York Film Festival Roman Polanski: Odd Man OutToronto Film Festival Roman Polanski: Odd Man OutTribeca Film Festival Richard Pryor: Omit the LogicSXSW Film Festival Independent's Day, Fantastic LiesSlamdance Film Festival Independent's DayLos Angeles Film Festival Who Is Bernard Tapie?Santa Barbara International Film Festival Independent's DayIDFA Independent's Day, Who Is Bernard Tapie?; Richard Pryor: Omit the LogicSheffield International Film Festival Richard Pryor: Omit the LogicDeauville Film Festival Who Is Bernard Tapie?, Roman Polanski: Wanted and DesiredTorino Film Festival Roman Polanski: Wanted and DesiredEdinburgh Film Festival Roman Polanski: Wanted and DesiredZurich Film Festival Roman Polanski: Wanted and Desired; Roman Polanski: Odd Man OutMelbourne International Film Festival Roman Polanski: Wanted and DesiredOldenburg Film Festival Who Is Bernard Tapie?Libertas Film Festival Roman Polanski: Wanted and DesiredFilmography
1997 – Independent's Day2001 – Who Is Bernard Tapie?2003 – Estonia Dreams of Eurovision!Early 2000s – Art in Progress (TV series)
2008 – Roman Polanski: Wanted and Desired2012 – Roman Polanski: Odd Man Out2013 – Richard Pryor: Omit the Logic2014 – Fantastic Lies2016 – Water & Power: A California Heist2018 – Robin Williams: Come Inside My Mind2020 – LANCE2021 - The Way Down''

Personal life
Zenovich is married to the British writer and producer P.G. Morgan. They have one son.

References

External links
 

USC Annenberg School for Communication and Journalism alumni
People from Fresno, California
American people of Serbian descent
Living people
American documentary film directors
Film directors from California
American women documentary filmmakers
Year of birth missing (living people)
21st-century American women